Magnum Collection 1999 "Dear" (stylized as MAGNUM COLLECTION 1999 "Dear") is Japanese singer-songwriter Masaharu Fukuyama's second compilation album, released on December 8, 1999. The album debuted at the top of the Oricon chart with sales of 373,790. This is currently the best-selling album by the artist.

Track listing

Disc 1 track 1 from the album Dengon, track 2 from the album Lion, track 3 from the album Bros, tracks 4 and 5 from the album Boots, tracks 6 and 7 from the album Calling, track 10 from the album On and On. Disc 2 track 1 from the album M Collection, track 4 and 5 from the album Sing a Song, track 8 and 9 from the album Dear, track 13 from the album On and On.

Chart rankings

References

1999 compilation albums
Masaharu Fukuyama albums